Shaw is a city in Bolivar and Sunflower counties, Mississippi, United States, located in the Mississippi Delta region. The name was derived from an old Indian tribe northeast of this region. The population was 1,952 at the 2010 census.

History
On June 30, 1914, Jack Farmer, an African-American resident of Shaw, was being sought by a white posse for allegedly murdering Earl Chase, a white man, also a resident of Shaw. Two deaths took place during the intense search: Jennie Collins, an African-American woman thought to have assisted Farmer in his flight, and James Jolly, a member of the posse who was mistaken for Farmer in the darkness. Both were shot and killed as the posse swept through a local swamp where Farmer was believed to be hiding. Farmer was never located.

Shaw gained national attention in 1971 when a group of local residents led by Andrew Hawkins sued the town for violating their Fourteenth Amendment right to equal protection under the law. In Hawkins v. Town of Shaw, the residents claimed the town had discriminated against black neighborhoods in the way it distributed public services, noting that while 99 percent of homes occupied by whites had access to sewers, only 80 percent of black-occupied homes had sewer access. Water pressure was also lower in black neighborhoods. The Fifth Circuit Court ruled in favor of the plaintiffs, and ordered Shaw to equalize access to public services such as fire hydrants, water mains, lighting, sewers and street paving. The ruling was considered a watershed civil rights victory, with some commentators comparing it to Brown v. Board of Education.  However, the case did not encourage a wave of similar lawsuits in other jurisdictions.

Geography
Shaw is almost entirely in Bolivar County, with a small portion extending east into adjacent Sunflower County. In the 2000 census, all of the city's 2,313 residents lived in Bolivar County. Although no residents lived in the Sunflower County portion in 2000, that figure had risen to 1 by 2006.

According to the United States Census Bureau, the city has a total area of 1.1 square miles (2.9 km), all land.

Demographics

2020 census

As of the 2020 United States Census, there were 1,457 people, 737 households, and 548 families residing in the city.

2000 census
As of the census of 2000, there were 2,312 people, 753 households, and 573 families residing in the city. The population density was 2,082.8 people per square mile (804.2/km). There were 785 housing units at an average density of 707.2 per square mile (273.1/km). The racial makeup of the city was 7.31% White, 92.08% African American, 0.04% Native American, 0.09% Asian, 0.04% Pacific Islander, 0.22% from other races, and 0.22% from two or more races. Hispanic or Latino of any race were 0.99% of the population.

There were 753 households, out of which 37.6% had children under the age of 18 living with them, 33.5% were married couples living together, 37.8% had a female householder with no husband present, and 23.9% were non-families. 21.4% of all households were made up of individuals, and 8.6% had someone living alone who was 65 years of age or older. The average household size was 3.07 and the average family size was 3.58.

In the city, the population was spread out, with 33.9% under the age of 18, 11.7% from 18 to 24, 25.6% from 25 to 44, 18.9% from 45 to 64, and 9.9% who were 65 years of age or older. The median age was 29 years. For every 100 females, there were 82.9 males. For every 100 females age 18 and over, there were 74.6 males.

The median income for a household in the city was $18,878, and the median income for a family was $19,393. Males had a median income of $21,181 versus $18,816 for females. The per capita income for the city was $9,070. About 41.3% of families and 41.6% of the population were below the poverty line, including 53.5% of those under age 18 and 31.3% of those age 65 or over.

Education
Most of Shaw is served by the West Bolivar Consolidated School District, while the small portion of the city that lies in Sunflower County is served by the Sunflower County School District. McEvans Warriors K-12 School is the K-12 school in town; Shaw High School and McEvans Elementary School merged effective 2020.

The Bolivar County part of Shaw was in the Shaw School District until July 1, 2014, when that district was consolidated into West Bolivar Consolidated.

Notable people
 Katie G. Dorsett, Democratic member of the North Carolina General Assembly
 David Honeyboy Edwards, blues singer and guitarist
 Boo Ferriss, former professional baseball pitcher for the Boston Red Sox
 Paul Gallo, radio show host
 Louis Satterfield, musician
 Bill Triplett, football player

References

Cities in Mississippi
Cities in Bolivar County, Mississippi
Cities in Sunflower County, Mississippi